James Clark (born 13 December 1976) is a Scottish soccer coach and former professional player who is currently the head coach of the University of Washington.

Early life
James "Jamie" Clark was born on 13 December 1976 in Aberdeen, Scotland. His father is former player Bobby Clark.

Career

College career
Clark, a defender, played his freshman season of college soccer at University of North Carolina, before transferring to Stanford University, where he graduated in 1999.

Professional career
Clark was selected in the 1999 MLS College Draft by the San Jose Clash. Clark made his debut for San Jose before he had graduated from college, and played in twenty consecutive games for the club during his first season. Clark made 34 league appearances in total for San Jose. While at San Jose, Clark spent a brief loan spell at Scottish side Aberdeen, although he never made a league appearance at the club. He also played one game on loan to MLS Pro 40 during the 2000 USL A-League season. Clark spent a total of two-and-a-half seasons playing in Major League Soccer, before returning to Scotland to play with Falkirk and Raith Rovers, before being forced to retire from playing due to a groin injury.

Coaching career
Clark was an assistant coach at the University of New Mexico from 2002 to 2005, and an assistant coach at the University of Notre Dame from 2006 to 2007. Clark was named as head coach of Harvard University in February 2008. He led the Crimson to a 26–10–1 record in his two years there, earning bids to the NCAA tournament both seasons. In June 2010, he was named head coach at Creighton University. He coached the Bluejays for one season, leading them to a 13–5–2 record and an at-large berth in the NCAA tournament, where Creighton reached the second round before losing to SMU in a shootout. On 26 January 2011, he resigned at Creighton to become head coach of the Washington Huskies.

Honours 
New Mexico Lobos
NCAA Tournament Championship: Runners-up 2005 (as assistant)

Harvard Crimson
Ivy League Championship: 2009

Creighton Blue Jays
MVC Regular Season Championship: 2010

Washington Huskies
Pac-12 Conference Championship: 2013, 2019, 2020

Individual
NSCAA Northeast Region Coach of Year: 2009
Pac-12 Coach of the Year: 2013, 2019, 2020, 2022

References

External links
 Washington bio

1976 births
Living people
Footballers from Aberdeen
Scottish footballers
Scottish football managers
North Carolina Tar Heels men's soccer players
Stanford Cardinal men's soccer players
San Jose Earthquakes players
Aberdeen F.C. players
Minnesota Thunder players
Falkirk F.C. players
Raith Rovers F.C. players
Scottish Football League players
Creighton Bluejays men's soccer coaches
Harvard Crimson men's soccer coaches
Washington Huskies men's soccer coaches
Major League Soccer players
A-League (1995–2004) players
MLS Pro-40 players
Scottish expatriate footballers
Scottish expatriate football managers
Expatriate soccer players in the United States
San Jose Earthquakes draft picks
All-American men's college soccer players
Association football defenders
Scottish expatriate sportspeople in the United States